The following is a list of the national television and radio networks and announcers who have covered the American League Division Series throughout the years. It does include any announcers who may have appeared on local radio broadcasts produced by the participating teams.

Television

2020s

2010s

Notes
TNT was scheduled to air three entire Division Series games in 2011 due to conflicts with TBS. On October 1, it aired Game 2 of the Tampa Bay Rays vs. the Texas Rangers at 7 p.m. ET, which overlapped with the end of Game 1 of the St. Louis Cardinals vs. the Philadelphia Phillies and the continuation of Game 1 of the Detroit Tigers vs. the New York Yankees on TBS. (The latter was also to have been Game 2, but Game 1 was suspended after 1½ innings due to rain.) On October 2, it aired the rescheduled Game 2 between the Tigers and the Yankees at 3 p.m. ET, two hours before Game 2 of the Arizona Diamondbacks vs. the Milwaukee Brewers on TBS. On October 4, it aired Game 3 of the Diamondbacks vs. the Brewers at 9:30 p.m. ET, one hour after Game 3 of the Tigers vs. the Yankees started on TBS.
For the 2012 and 2013 seasons, TBS has been awarded the rights to televise both Wild Card Playoff games that occur on the day before the Division Series games. In exchange, MLB Network has been awarded the rights to televise two of the Division Series games that previously belonged to TBS.
Beginning in 2014, when Fox Sports began a new television contract with Major League Baseball, FS1 airs 40 regular season MLB games (mostly on Saturdays), along with up to 15 post-season games (eight Divisional Series games and one best-of-7 League Championship Series). The deal resulted in a reduction of MLB coverage on the Fox network, which will air 12 regular season games, the All-Star Game, and the World Series.
Don Orsillo replaced Ernie Johnson on TBS' 2018 ALDS coverage after Johnson announced that he would not cover the Major League Baseball playoffs as a result of his treatment for the blood clots in both of his legs.

2000s

Notes
In 2000, NBC was caught in the dilemma of having to televise a first round playoff game between the New York Yankees and Oakland Athletics over the first presidential debate between George W. Bush and Al Gore. NBC decided to give its local stations the option of carrying the debate or the baseball game. If the NBC affiliate decided to carry the debate, then local Pax affiliate could carry the game. However, if there was no Pax availability and the local NBC affiliate aired the debate (which actually occurred in most NBC affiliates), then that market was shut out of the baseball telecast.
Skip Caray filled-in for Bob Costas on NBC's coverage of the 2000 New York-Oakland Division Series because Costas had just finished anchoring NBC's prime time coverage of the Summer Olympic Games from Sydney, Australia. Meanwhile, NBC used Bob Wischusen as a field reporter (filling-in for Jim Gray, who like Bob Costas, was covering the Sydney Olympics) for Game 1 of the ALDS.
ABC Family's coverage of the Division Series was produced by ESPN. The reason that games were on ABC Family instead of ESPN was because The Walt Disney Company (ESPN's parent company) bought Fox Family from News Corporation. The ABC Family/ESPN inherited Division Series package was included in Fox's then exclusive television contract with Major League Baseball (initiated in 2001). ABC Family had no other choice but to fulfill the contract handed to them. The only usage of the ABC Family "bug" was for a ten-second period when returning from a commercial break (in the lower right corner of the screen). 
Game 2 (played on October 2) of the Minnesota/Oakland series in 2002 started on ESPN2 because the San Francisco-Atlanta game (which started at 1 p.m. Eastern Time) ran over the three-hour time window. The game was eventually switched back to ABC Family once the early game ended.
Former longtime Tigers announcer Ernie Harwell served as a special guest commentator for two innings in Game 3 of the  Tigers-Yankees series.
Turner Sports provided a provisional plan in which if a League Division Series game televised on TBS ran into the start of the next LDS game scheduled to air on TBS, then TNT would provide supplementary coverage of the latter games' early moments. To be more specific, all games in the Division Series round were presented back-to-back, with each game scheduled for a 3½-hour window. If a game exceeded this window, the first pitch of the next game would be switched to TNT. If a game ended within 3½ hours, the studio team would return for interstitial programming.
In , TBS switched the starts of four games to TNT in the Division Series round because the previous games exceeded the time limit. TNT was also scheduled to air Game 4 of the Diamondbacks-Cubs series, which overlapped with Game 3 of the Red Sox-Angels series, but the former game was not played; the night before, the D-Backs completed a three-game sweep of the Cubs.

1990s

Notes
 marked the only year of postseason coverage provided by "The Baseball Network", which was a revenue sharing joint venture between Major League Baseball, ABC and NBC. All games in the first two rounds (including the League Championship Series) were scheduled in the same time slot for regional telecasts. Initially, under the alternating six-year plan, ABC would've covered the Division Series in even numbered years (as well as the World Series in even numbered years) while NBC would've covered the Division Series in odd numbered years (in even numbered years, they would've gotten the rights to the All-Star Game and League Championship Series).
From –, NBC aired LDS games on Tuesday/Friday/Saturday nights. Fox aired LDS games on Wednesday/Thursday nights, Saturdays in the late afternoon, plus Sunday/Monday nights (if necessary). Meanwhile, ESPN carried many afternoon LDS contests. At this point, all playoff games were nationally televised (mostly in unopposed timeslots).

1981

Notes
In , as means to recoup revenue lost during a players strike, Major League Baseball set up a special additional playoff round (as a prelude to the League Championship Series). ABC televised the American League Division Series while NBC televised the National League Division Series. The Division Series round wouldn't be officially instituted until 14 years later. Games 3 of the Brewers/Yankees series and Royals/Athletics series were aired regionally. On October 10, Keith Jackson called an Oklahoma vs. Texas college football game for ABC and missed Game 4 of the Milwaukee-New York series. In Jackson's absence, Don Drysdale filled-in for him on play-by-play alongside Howard Cosell. Bob Uecker was originally named to join Al Michaels and Jim Palmer on ABC's secondary crew, but the network excused him due to the involvement of the Brewers (for whom Uecker was a local radio announcer) in the ALDS.

Radio

National

2020s

Notes
 Due to health and safety concerns related to the COVID-19 pandemic, all of ESPN Radio's commentators for the 2020 postseason called the games off of monitors at the ESPN studios in Bristol, Connecticut.

2010s

2000s

1990s

1981

Local

2000s

1990s

References

External links
Division Series Video
Division Series numbers game
Searchable Network TV Broadcasts
Episode List: MLB ALDS - TV Tango

Broadcasters
+ALDS
ABC Sports
Major League Baseball on Fox
Major League Baseball on NBC
Turner Sports
ESPN announcers
ESPN2
Freeform (TV channel)
Ion Television
ESPN Radio
CBS Radio Sports
MLB Network
Major League Baseball on the radio